Zambia is a multi-party system with the United Party for National Development in power. Opposition parties are allowed and do have some significant representation in government.

Active parties

Parties represented in the National Assembly

Other parties

 Agenda for Development Party for the People
 Agenda for Zambia
 Alliance for a Better Zambia
 Alliance for Democracy and Development
 Common Cause for Democracy
 Democratic Party
 Forum for Democracy and Development
 Green Party of Zambia (Greens)
 Merge Zambia Party (MZ) 
 Movement for Multi-Party Democracy
 National Alliance Party
 National Democratic Focus
 National Restoration Party
 New Heritage Party
 People’s Convention Independence Party
 People's Party (Zambia)
 Rainbow Party
 Republican Progressive Party
 Social Democratic Party
 Socialist Party
 United Liberal Party
 United National Independence Party
 Zambians For Empowerment and Development
 Zambia Republican Party

Defunct parties
 Zambian African National Congress (1948–1972)
 Zambian African National Congress (1958–1959)
 United Progressive Party (1971–1972)
 New Generation Party
 National Democratic Alliance (1990-?)

See also
 Politics of Zambia
 List of political parties by country

Zambia
 
Political parties
Zambia
Political parties